Pastori is an Italian surname. Notable people with the surname include:

 Antonietta Pastori (born 1929), Italian operatic soprano
 Giuseppina Pastori (1891–1983), Italian physician and biologist
 Maria Pastori (1895-1975), Italian mathematician

See also
 Niña Pastori, stage name of María Rosa García García (1978), Spanish flamenco singer

Italian-language surnames